The Fujifilm FinePix S1800 is a digital camera manufactured by Fujifilm as part of their FinePix range. It is a superzoom camera capable of capturing 12 megapixel stills and HD video. The S1800 is part of FujiFilm's bridge camera series which bridges the gap between compact and SLR cameras.

References

External links
Photography Blog Review

S1800
Cameras introduced in 2010
Bridge digital cameras